Nangal Kalan is one of the biggest villages of Mansa district, Punjab, India. The population is Punjabi-speaking and is wedded to the Malwa culture of Punjab.

Nangal Kalan is situated in the cotton belt of Punjab.

Geography
It has an average elevation of 212 metres (695 feet).

References

Villages in Mansa district, India